The McLaren M26 was a Formula One racing car designed by Gordon Coppuck for the McLaren team, to replace the aging McLaren M23 model. The car was designed to be a lighter and lower car than its predecessor, with a smaller frontal area and narrower monocoque. Coppuck began design work in early 1976, with a view to introducing the car in the mid season.

Design and competition history
Upon first tests by Jochen Mass, problems with the cooling were encountered and Coppuck had to redesign the radiator installation for more effective airflow. After the changes were made, Mass resumed testing the car, and the M26 made its debut at the Dutch Grand Prix that year in his hands. After the first race was completed with the car, it was decided amongst the team that the car needed further design work done, especially to the nose section and the M26 was not used again during 1976.

McLaren relied on the M23 during the rest of the season and for the first few races of 1977 until it was deemed necessary that the M26 was to race in light of the wilting performance of its predecessor. The redesigned car made its debut at the Spanish Grand Prix, where it proved to be a solid, if unspectacular performer. James Hunt, who initially hated the car knuckled down to improve the race pace and reliability of the M26, and throughout the season the car's performance improved noticeably. Hunt won three times during the course of the season, and scored two other podium finishes in the second half of the season. Two other potential victories were lost in Austria and Canada through reliability issues when Hunt was leading easily. At season's end, McLaren had scored 69 points and were third in the constructors' championship.

The M26 was updated for the 1978 season and Mass was replaced by Patrick Tambay. But after a promising start to the season for Hunt, things began to go drastically wrong for him and for the McLaren team. Lotus introduced their ground breaking Lotus 79 and the M26 was immediately obsolete. Hunt tried too hard in several races making up for the performance deficit which led to race ending retirements, but the pure superiority of the Lotus caused his motivation to fall. Coppuck did an extensive redesign in the mid season, turning the M26 into a partial ground effect car dubbed the M26E. He enlarged the sidepods for the ground effect venturis, redesigned the suspension and added smaller wings front and rear, but there was no improvement in the cars' form and without a test driver to sort the cars' issues, the team's fortunes sunk even further.

The M26 was retired after a couple of runs in early 1979. The slow decline of McLaren had begun and it would not be until 1981 that the team would win again.

In all, the M26 won three races and scored 86 points in its career.

In 1980 Tiga rebuilt an M26 as a full ground effects car and it was re-engined with a five-litre Chevrolet engine and raced as a Formula 5000. Alfredo Costanzo used this car to win the 1981 Australian Drivers' Championship.

In 2009 Bobby Verdon-Roe won the FIA Historic Formula One Championship driving a McLaren M26.

Complete Formula One World Championship results

(key) (results in bold indicate pole position; results in italics indicate fastest lap)

* All points in  scored using the McLaren M23* 21 points in  scored using the McLaren M23* All points in  scored using the McLaren M28 and McLaren M29

References

External links

McLaren Formula One cars
1976 Formula One season cars
1977 Formula One season cars
1978 Formula One season cars
1979 Formula One season cars
Formula 5000 cars